Talalayevka is a rural locality (a selo) in Podlesnensky Selsoviet, Sterlitamaksky District, Bashkortostan, Russia. The population was 590 as of 2010. There are 6 streets.

Geography 
Talalayevka is located 28 km north of Sterlitamak (the district's administrative centre) by road. Ishparsovo is the nearest rural locality.

References 

Rural localities in Sterlitamaksky District